The 2008–09 National Division Three South was the ninth and last season (22nd overall)  of the fourth division (south) of the English domestic rugby union competition using the name National Division Three South.  The division was set to be re-branded National League 2 South for the following season due to an RFU reshuffle of the entire league system.  New teams to the division included Henley Hawks who were relegated from the 2007–08 National Division Two while promoted teams included Richmond (champions) and Worthing Raiders (playoffs) from London Division 1, Chinnor who returned after an absence of just one year as champions of South West Division 1 and finally Rugby Lions who were transferred from the 2008–09 National Division Three North to ensure that there was not an imbalance of teams between the two regional leagues.  The league system was 4 points for a win, 2 points for a draw and additional bonus points being awarded for scoring 4 or more tries and/or losing within 7 points of the victorious team. In terms of promotion the league champions would go straight up into what would be known as National League 1 from 2009-10 but unlike previous years, there would be no promotion playoff between the runners up of the division and the runners up of National Division Three North due to the league restructuring.

London Scottish finished the season as champions and clinched the only promotion spot to the (newly named) 2009–10 National League 1.  The Richmond-based side had a fantastic season with only the one draw against Rugby Lions early on in the season blemishing what would have been a perfect record (this was achieved by Plymouth Albion back in the 2001-02 season).  Fellow Londoners, runners up Rosslyn Park had a good season which could have seen them champions on any other year but even they finished 22 points behind Scottish and did not have the consolation of  a playoff due to the league restructuring.  The two relegation spots were filled by Havant, who were comfortably the worst team in the division (ending a five-year stay in National 3 South), and Chinnor, who went straight back down yet again but were much improved from their last time spent in the division.  Havant would drop to National League 3 London & South East (formerly London Division 1) while Chinnor would drop to National League 3 South West (formerly South West Division 1).

Participating teams and locations

Final league table

Results

Round 1 

Postponed.  Game rescheduled to 14 March 2009.

Round 2

Round 3

Round 4

Round 5

Round 6

Round 7

Round 8

Round 9

Round 10

Round 11

Round 12

Round 13

Round 14 

Postponed.  Game rescheduled to 17 January 2009.

Postponed.  Game rescheduled to 14 March 2009.

Postponed.  Game rescheduled to 14 March 2009.

Postponed.  Game rescheduled to 17 January 2009.

Postponed.  Game rescheduled to 17 January 2009.

Round 15 

Postponed.  Game rescheduled to 11 April 2009.

Postponed.  Game rescheduled to 11 April 2009.

Postponed.  Game rescheduled to 17 January 2009.

Postponed.  Game rescheduled to 11 April 2009.

Postponed.  Game rescheduled to 14 March 2009.

Postponed.  Game rescheduled to 14 March 2009.

Postponed.  Game rescheduled to 11 April 2009.

Rounds 14 & 15 (rescheduled games) 

Game rescheduled from 10 January 2009.

Game rescheduled from 3 January 2009.

Game rescheduled from 3 January 2009.

Game rescheduled from 3 January 2009.

Round 16 

Postponed.  Game rescheduled to 2 May 2009.

Round 17

Round 18 

Postponed.  Game rescheduled to 14 March 2009.

Postponed.  Game rescheduled to 25 April 2009.

Postponed.  Game rescheduled to 11 April 2009.

Postponed.  Game rescheduled to 23 April 2009.

Postponed.  Game rescheduled to 25 April 2009.

Postponed.  Game rescheduled to 25 April 2009.

Postponed.  Game rescheduled to 25 April 2009.

Round 19 

Postponed.  Game rescheduled to 2 May 2009.

Round 20

Round 21

Round 22

Rounds 1, 14, 15 & 18 (rescheduled games) 

Game rescheduled from 7 February 2009.

Game rescheduled from 6 September 2008.

Game rescheduled from 3 January 2009.

Game rescheduled from 3 January 2009.

Game rescheduled from 10 January 2009.

Game rescheduled from 10 January 2009.

Round 23

Round 24

Round 25

Rounds 15 & 18 (rescheduled games) 

Game rescheduled from 10 January 2009.

Game rescheduled from 10 January 2009.

Game rescheduled from 7 February 2009.

Game rescheduled from 10 January 2009.

Game rescheduled from 10 January 2009.

Round 26

Round 18 (rescheduled games) 

Game rescheduled from 7 February 2008.

Game rescheduled from 7 February 2008.

Game rescheduled from 7 February 2008.

Game rescheduled from 7 February 2008.

Game rescheduled from 7 February 2008.

Rounds 16 & 19 (rescheduled games) 

Game rescheduled from 24 January 2009.

Game rescheduled from 14 February 2009.

Total season attendances

Individual statistics 

 Note that points scorers includes tries as well as conversions, penalties and drop goals.

Top points scorers

Top try scorers

Season records

Team
Largest home win — 82 pts
85 - 3 London Scottish at home to Rugby Lions on 21 March 2009
Largest away win — 58 pts
71 - 13 London Scottish away to Worthing Raiders on 11 April 2009
Most points scored — 85 pts
85 - 3 London Scottish at home to Rugby Lions on 21 March 2009
Most tries in a match — 12
London Scottish at home to Barking on 6 December 2008
Most conversions in a match — 10
London Scottish at home to Barking on 6 December 2008
Most penalties in a match — 6 (x3)
Rugby Lions at home to Bridgwater & Albion on 6 September 2008
Richmond at home to Lydney on 13 September 2008
Lydney away to Henley Hawks on 29 November 2008
Most drop goals in a match — 2
Lydney at home to Worthing Raiders on 6 September 2008

Player
Most points in a match — 28
 Ben Ward for Ealing Trailfinders at home to Lydney on 11 October 2008
Most tries in a match — 5 
 David Howells for Ealing Trailfinders away to Bridgwater & Albion on 29 November 2008
Most conversions in a match — 10
 James Brown for London Scottish at home to Barking on 6 December 2008
Most penalties in a match — 6 (x2)
 Matt Goode for Rugby Lions at home to Bridgwater & Albion on 6 September 2008
 Mart Hart for Richmond at home to Lydney on 13 September 2008
Most drop goals in a match — 2
 Mark Davies for Lydney at home to Worthing Raiders on 6 September 2008

Attendances
Highest — 2,100  
London Scottish at home to Richmond on 24 January 2009
Lowest — 75 
Chinnor at home to Havant on 29 November 2008
Highest Average Attendance — 948
London Scottish
Lowest Average Attendance — 118
Chinnor

See also
 English rugby union system
 Rugby union in England

References

External links
 NCA Rugby

2008-09
2008–09 in English rugby union leagues